is a Japanese professional shogi player, ranked 8-dan. He is a former executive director of the Japan Shogi Association.

Early life
Daisuke Nakagawa was born in Sendai, Japan on July 13, 1968. He was promoted to 1-dan in 1985, and was awarded full professional status and the rank of 4-dan in October 1987.

Shogi professional

Promotion history
Nakagawa's promotion history is as follows:
 6-kyū: 1983
 1-dan: 1985
 4-dan: October 19, 1987
 5-dan: November 27, 1990
 6-dan: June 28, 1994
 7-dan: October 20, 2000
 8-dan: December 11, 2009

Titles and other championships
Nakagawa has won one non-major-title championship during his career: the 11th  tournament in 1987.

Awards and honors
Nakagawa received the JSA's "Shogi Honor Fighting-spirit Award" in  December 2011 for winning 600 official games as a professional.

JSA executive
Nakagawa has served on the Japan Shogi Association's board of directors on multiple occasions. He was first elected as a director at the association's 58th General Meeting on May 25, 2007, and was re-elected to the same position on May 26, 2009.

In May 2011, Nakagawa was selected to be an executive director at the JSA's 62nd General Meeting, but resigned his position for personal reasons in December of that same year.

At the JSA's 64th General Meeting in June 2013, Nakagawa was once again selected to be a JSA executive director. He was re-elected to the same position in 2015, but was one of three members of the board voted out of office by the JSA membership at an emergency meeting held in February 2017 for their involvement in the 29th Ryūō challenger controversy.

References

External links
ShogiHub: Professional Player Info · Nakagawa, Daisuke

Japanese shogi players
Living people
Professional shogi players
People from Sendai
Professional shogi players from Miyagi Prefecture
1968 births